K. Venkatesan is an Indian politician. He was elected to the Puducherry Legislative Assembly from Thattanchavady, Puducherry in the by-election in 2019 by a narrow margin of 1000 votes as a member of the Dravida Munnetra Kazhagam.

During 2021 Puducherry political crisis, Venkatesan was one of the six MLA's who resigned from the Assembly which leads to the fall of V. Narayanasamy's Congress government in the Union Territory of Puducherry.

In May 2021, Venkatesan is a member of the Puducherry Legislative Assembly from May 11, 2021, as he was nominated by the Central Government of India.

References 

Living people
Year of birth missing (living people)
21st-century Indian politicians
People from Puducherry
Dravida Munnetra Kazhagam politicians
Bharatiya Janata Party politicians from Puducherry
Puducherry politicians
Nominated members of the Puducherry Legislative Assembly
Puducherry MLAs 2016–2021
Puducherry MLAs 2021–2026